Squash, for the 2019 Island Games held at the Europa Sports Complex – Squash Centre, Gibraltar in July 2019.

Medal table

Results

References 

2019 Island Games
2019
Island Games